The 2023 Cincinnati Reds season will be the 154th season for the franchise in Major League Baseball, and their 21st at Great American Ball Park in Cincinnati.

Off-season

Rule changes 
Pursuant to the CBA, new rule changes will be in place for the 2023 season:

 institution of a pitch clock between pitches;
 limits on pickoff attempts per plate appearance;
 limits on defensive shifts requiring two infielders to be on either side of second and be within the boundary of the infield; and
 larger bases (increased to 18-inch squares);

Transactions

October 2022

Source

November 2022

Source

December 2022

Source

January 2023

Source

February 2023

Source

March 2023

Source

Regular season

Game Log

|- style="background: 
| 1 || March 30 || Pirates || – || || || — || || – ||
|- style="background: 
| 2 || April 1 || Pirates || – || || || — || || – ||
|- style="background: 
| 3 || April 2 || Pirates || – || || || — || || – ||
|- style="background: 
| 4 || April 3 || Cubs || – || || || — || || – ||
|- style="background: 
| 5 || April 4 || Cubs || – || || || — || || – ||
|- style="background: 
| 6 || April 5 || Cubs || – || || || — || || – ||
|- style="background: 
| 7 || April 6 || @ Phillies || – || || || — || || – ||
|- style="background: 
| 8 || April 8 || @ Phillies || – || || || — || || – ||
|- style="background: 
| 9 || April 9 || @ Phillies || – || || || — || || – ||
|- style="background: 
| 10 || April 10 || @ Braves || – || || || — || || – ||
|- style="background: 
| 11 || April 11 || @ Braves || – || || || — || || – ||
|- style="background: 
| 12 || April 12 || @ Braves || – || || || — || || – ||
|- style="background: 
| 13 || April 13 || Phillies || – || || || — || || – ||
|- style="background: 
| 14 || April 14 || Phillies || – || || || — || || – ||
|- style="background: 
| 15 || April 15 || Phillies || – || || || — || || – ||
|- style="background: 
| 16 || April 16 || Phillies || – || || || — || || – ||
|- style="background: 
| 17 || April 17 || Rays || – || || || — || || – ||
|- style="background: 
| 18 || April 18 || Rays || – || || || — || || – ||
|- style="background: 
| 19 || April 19 || Rays || – || || || — || || – ||
|- style="background: 
| 20 || April 20 || @ Pirates || – || || || — || || – ||
|- style="background: 
| 21 || April 21 || @ Pirates || – || || || — || || – ||
|- style="background: 
| 22 || April 22 || @ Pirates || – || || || — || || – ||
|- style="background: 
| 23 || April 23 || @ Pirates || – || || || — || || – ||
|- style="background: 
| 24 || April 24 || Rangers || – || || || — || || – ||
|- style="background: 
| 25 || April 25 || Rangers || – || || || — || || – ||
|- style="background: 
| 26 || April 26 || Rangers || – || || || — || || – ||
|- style="background: 
| 27 || April 28 || @ Athletics || – || || || — || || – ||
|- style="background: 
| 28 || April 29 || @ Athletics || – || || || — || || – ||
|- style="background: 
| 29 || April 30 || @ Athletics || – || || || — || || – ||
|- 
 

|- style="background: 
| 30 || May 1 || @ Padres || – || || || — || || – ||
|- style="background: 
| 31 || May 2 || @ Padres || – || || || — || || – ||
|- style="background: 
| 32 || May 3 || @ Padres || – || || || — || || – ||
|- style="background: 
| 33 || May 5 || White Sox || – || || || — || || – ||
|- style="background: 
| 34 || May 6 || White Sox || – || || || — || || – ||
|- style="background: 
| 35 || May 7 || White Sox || – || || || — || || – ||
|- style="background: 
| 36 || May 9 || Mets || – || || || — || || – ||
|- style="background: 
| 37 || May 10 || Mets || – || || || — || || – ||
|- style="background: 
| 38 || May 11 || Mets || – || || || — || || – ||
|- style="background: 
| 39 || May 12 || @ Marlins || – || || || — || || – ||
|- style="background: 
| 40 || May 13 || @ Marlins || – || || || — || || – ||
|- style="background: 
| 41 || May 14 || @ Marlins || – || || || — || || – ||
|- style="background: 
| 42 || May 15 || @ Rockies || – || || || — || || – ||
|- style="background: 
| 43 || May 16 || @ Rockies || – || || || — || || – ||
|- style="background: 
| 44 || May 17 || @ Rockies || – || || || — || || – ||
|- style="background: 
| 45 || May 19 || Yankees || – || || || — || || – ||
|- style="background: 
| 46 || May 20 || Yankees || – || || || — || || – ||
|- style="background: 
| 47 || May 21 || Yankees || – || || || — || || – ||
|- style="background: 
| 48 || May 22 || Cardinals || – || || || — || || – ||
|- style="background: 
| 49 || May 23 || Cardinals || – || || || — || || – ||
|- style="background: 
| 50 || May 24 || Cardinals || – || || || — || || – ||
|- style="background: 
| 51 || May 25 || Cardinals || – || || || — || || – ||
|- style="background: 
| 52 || May 26 || @ Cubs || – || || || — || || – ||
|- style="background: 
| 53 || May 27 || @ Cubs || – || || || — || || – ||
|- style="background: 
| 54 || May 28 || @ Cubs || – || || || — || || – ||
|- style="background: 
| 55 || May 30 || @ Red Sox || – || || || — || || – ||
|- style="background: 
| 56 || May 31 || @ Red Sox || – || || || — || || – ||
|- 
 

|- style="background: 
| 57 || June 1 || @ Red Sox || – || || || — || || – ||
|- style="background: 
| 58 || June 2 || Brewers || – || || || — || || – ||
|- style="background: 
| 59 || June 3 || Brewers || – || || || — || || – ||
|- style="background: 
| 60 || June 4 || Brewers || – || || || — || || – ||
|- style="background: 
| 61 || June 5 || Brewers || – || || || — || || – ||
|- style="background: 
| 62 || June 6 || Dodgers || – || || || — || || – ||
|- style="background: 
| 63 || June 7 || Dodgers || – || || || — || || – ||
|- style="background: 
| 64 || June 8 || Dodgers || – || || || — || || – ||
|- style="background: 
| 65 || June 9 || @ Cardinals || – || || || — || || – ||
|- style="background: 
| 66 || June 10 || @ Cardinals || – || || || — || || – ||
|- style="background: 
| 67 || June 11 || @ Cardinals || – || || || — || || – ||
|- style="background: 
| 68 || June 12 || @ Royals || – || || || — || || – ||
|- style="background: 
| 69 || June 13 || @ Royals || – || || || — || || – ||
|- style="background: 
| 70 || June 14 || @ Royals || – || || || — || || – ||
|- style="background: 
| 71 || June 16 || @ Astros || – || || || — || || – ||
|- style="background: 
| 72 || June 17 || @ Astros || – || || || — || || – ||
|- style="background: 
| 73 || June 18 || @ Astros || – || || || — || || – ||
|- style="background: 
| 74 || June 19 || Rockies || – || || || — || || – ||
|- style="background: 
| 75 || June 20 || Rockies || – || || || — || || – ||
|- style="background: 
| 76 || June 21 || Rockies || – || || || — || || – ||
|- style="background: 
| 77 || June 23 || Braves || – || || || — || || – || 
|- style="background: 
| 78 || June 24 || Braves || – || || || — || || – ||
|- style="background: 
| 79 || June 25 || Braves || – || || || — || || – ||
|- style="background: 
| 80 || June 26 || @ Orioles || – || || || — || || – ||
|- style="background: 
| 81 || June 27 || @ Orioles || – || || || — || || – ||
|- style="background: 
| 82 || June 28 || @ Orioles || – || || || — || || – ||
|- style="background: 
| 83 || June 30 || Padres || – || || || — || || – ||
|- 
 

|- style="background: 
| 84 || July 1 || Padres || – || || || — || || – ||
|- style="background: 
| 85 || July 2 || Padres || – || || || — || || – ||
|- style="background: 
| 86 || July 3 || @ Nationals || – || || || — || || – ||
|- style="background: 
| 87 || July 4 || @ Nationals || – || || || — || || – ||
|- style="background: 
| 88 || July 5 || @ Nationals || – || || || — || || – ||
|- style="background: 
| 89 || July 6 || @ Nationals || – || || || — || || – ||
|- style="background: 
| 90 || July 7 || @ Brewers || – || || || — || || – ||
|- style="background: 
| 91 || July 8 || @ Brewers || – || || || — || || – ||
|- style="background: 
| 92 || July 9 || @ Brewers || – || || || — || || – ||
|- style="text-align:center; background:#bff;"
| ASG || July 11 || NL @ AL || – || || || — || || ||
|- style="background:
| 93 || July 14 || Brewers || – || || || — || || – ||
|- style="background:
| 94 || July 15 || Brewers || – || || || — || || – ||
|- style="background:
| 95 || July 16 || Brewers || – || || || — || || – ||
|- style="background: 
| 96 || July 17 || Giants || – || || || — || || – ||
|- style="background: 
| 97 || July 18 || Giants || – || || || — || || – ||
|- style="background: 
| 98 || July 19 || Giants || – || || || — || || – ||
|- style="background: 
| 99 || July 20 || Giants || – || || || — || || – ||
|- style="background: 
| 100 || July 21 || Diamondbacks || – || || || — || || – ||
|- style="background: 
| 101 || July 22 || Diamondbacks || – || || || — || || – ||
|- style="background: 
| 102 || July 23 || Diamondbacks || – || || || — || || – ||
|- style="background: 
| 103 || July 24 || @ Brewers || – || || || — || || – ||
|- style="background: 
| 104 || July 25 || @ Brewers || – || || || — || || – ||
|- style="background: 
| 105 || July 26 || @ Brewers || – || || || — || || – ||
|- style="background: 
| 106 || July 28 || @ Dodgers || – || || || — || || – ||
|- style="background: 
| 107 || July 29 || @ Dodgers || – || || || — || || – ||
|- style="background: 
| 108 || July 30 || @ Dodgers || – || || || — || || – ||
|- style="background: 
| 109 || July 31 || @ Cubs || – || || || — || || – ||
|- 
 

|- style="background: 
| 110 || August 1 || @ Cubs || – || || || — || || – ||
|- style="background: 
| 111 || August 2 || @ Cubs || – || || || — || || – ||
|- style="background: 
| 112 || August 3 || @ Cubs || – || || || — || || – ||
|- style="background: 
| 113 || August 4 || Nationals || – || || || — || || – ||
|- style="background: 
| 114 || August 5 || Nationals || – || || || — || || – ||
|- style="background: 
| 115 || August 6 || Nationals || – || || || — || || – ||
|- style="background: 
| 116 || August 7 || Marlins || – || || || — || || – ||
|- style="background: 
| 117 || August 8 || Marlins || – || || || — || || – ||
|- style="background: 
| 118 || August 9 || Marlins || – || || || — || || – ||
|- style="background: 
| 119 || August 11 || @ Pirates || – || || || — || || – ||
|- style="background: 
| 120 || August 12 || @ Pirates || – || || || — || || – ||
|- style="background: 
| 121 || August 13 || @ Pirates || – || || || — || || – ||
|- style="background: 
| 122 || August 15 || Guardians || – || || || — || || – ||
|- style="background: 
| 123 || August 16 || Guardians || – || || || — || || – ||
|- style="background: 
| 124 || August 18 || Blue Jays || – || || || — || || – ||
|- style="background: 
| 125 || August 19 || Blue Jays || – || || || — || || – ||
|- style="background: 
| 126 || August 20 || Blue Jays || – || || || — || || – ||
|- style="background: 
| 127 || August 21 || @ Angels || – || || || — || || – ||
|- style="background: 
| 128 || August 22 || @ Angels || – || || || — || || – ||
|- style="background: 
| 129 || August 23 || @ Angels || – || || || — || || – ||
|- style="background: 
| 130 || August 24 || @ Diamondbacks || – || || || — || || – ||
|- style="background: 
| 131 || August 25 || @ Diamondbacks || – || || || — || || – ||
|- style="background: 
| 132 || August 26 || @ Diamondbacks || – || || || — || || – ||
|- style="background: 
| 133 || August 27 || @ Diamondbacks || – || || || — || || – ||
|- style="background: 
| 134 || August 28 || @ Giants || – || || || — || || – ||
|- style="background: 
| 135 || August 29 || @ Giants || – || || || — || || – ||
|- style="background: 
| 136 || August 30 || @ Giants || – || || || — || || – ||
|- 
 

|- style="background: 
| 137 || September 1 || Cubs || – || || || — || || – ||
|- style="background: 
| 138 || September 2 || Cubs || – || || || — || || – ||
|- style="background: 
| 139 || September 3 || Cubs || – || || || — || || – ||
|- style="background: 
| 140 || September 4 || Mariners || – || || || — || || – ||
|- style="background: 
| 141 || September 5 || Mariners || – || || || — || || – ||
|- style="background: 
| 142 || September 6 || Mariners || – || || || — || || – ||
|- style="background: 
| 143 || September 8 || Cardinals || – || || || — || || – ||
|- style="background: 
| 144 || September 9 || Cardinals || – || || || — || || – ||
|- style="background: 
| 145 || September 10 || Cardinals || – || || || — || || – ||
|- style="background: 
| 146 || September 12 || @ Tigers || – || || || — || || – ||
|- style="background: 
| 147 || September 13 || @ Tigers || – || || || — || || – ||
|- style="background: 
| 148 || September 14 || @ Tigers || – || || || — || || – ||
|- style="background: 
| 149 || September 15 || @ Mets || – || || || — || || – ||
|- style="background: 
| 150 || September 16 || @ Mets || – || || || — || || – ||
|- style="background: 
| 151 || September 17 || @ Mets || – || || || — || || – ||
|- style="background: 
| 152 || September 18 || Twins || – || || || — || || – ||
|- style="background: 
| 153 || September 19 || Twins || – || || || — || || – ||
|- style="background: 
| 154 || September 20 || Twins || – || || || — || || – ||
|- style="background: 
| 155 || September 22 || Pirates || – || || || — || || – ||
|- style="background: 
| 156 || September 23 || Pirates || – || || || — || || – ||
|- style="background: 
| 157 || September 24 || Pirates || – || || || — || || – ||
|- style="background: 
| 158 || September 26 || @ Guardians || – || || || — || || – ||
|- style="background: 
| 159 || September 27 || @ Guardians || – || || || — || || – ||
|- style="background: 
| 160 || September 29 || @ Cardinals || – || || || — || || – ||
|- style="background: 
| 161 || September 30 || @ Cardinals || – || || || — || || – ||
|- style="background: 
| 162 || October 1 || @ Cardinals || – || || || — || || – ||
|-

Standings

National League Central

National League Wild Card

Roster

Farm system

References

External links
Cincinnati Reds 2023 schedule at MLB.com
2023 Cincinnati Reds season at Baseball Reference

2022
2023 Major League Baseball season
2023 in sports in Ohio